Jacob Kaimenyi Thuranira (born 10 July 1952) is a Kenyan dentist who served as Cabinet Secretary for Education, and then Land, Housing, and Urban Development, in the Cabinet of President Uhuru Kenyatta, before being appointed as the Ambassador to Belgium.

Early life and education 
Kaimenyi was born in 1952. He holds a Bachelor of Dental Surgery Degree (BDS) and a Master of Dental Surgery in Periodontology (MDS)  from University of Nairobi. He furthered his education  at Nairobi University and acquired a Phd in periodontology.

Honors and awards 

 Order of the Burning Spear  EBS by the president.
 Elder of the Golden Heart E.G.H

References

1952 births
University of Nairobi alumni
Living people
Government ministers of Kenya
Kenyan dentists